Plymouth Marjon University, commonly referred to as Marjon, is the trading name of the University of St Mark and St John, a university based primarily on a single campus on the northern edge of Plymouth, Devon, United Kingdom. Formerly named University College Plymouth St Mark & St John, the institution was awarded full university status in 2013.

The Acting Vice-Chancellor of the university is Professor Michelle Jones, with Professor Claire Taylor recently announced as the permanent replacement for the role.

History 

The university's history dates back to the foundation by the National Society (now National Society for Promoting Religious Education) of the constituent London colleges of St John's College in Battersea, London (1840) and St Mark's College in Chelsea, London (1841). The former chapel of St Mark's College, designed by Edward Blore is on the Fulham Road, Chelsea, and is now a private residence. 

St Mark's College was founded upon the beliefs of The Reverend Derwent Coleridge, son of the poet Samuel Taylor Coleridge, its first principal: that its primary purpose was to widen the educational horizons of its students. During the First World War, St Mark's College was requisitioned by the War Office to create the 2nd London General Hospital, a facility for the Royal Army Medical Corps to treat military casualties. 

St John's College was established by Sir James Kay-Shuttleworth, together with Edward Carleton Tufnell, as a teacher training institution.

These colleges merged in 1923, establishing a single institution in Chelsea as the College of St Mark & St John.  In 1973 came the move to Plymouth due to the college outgrowing the Chelsea campus.

In 1991 the college became affiliated to the University of Exeter, which accredited it to run undergraduate and postgraduate programmes leading to degree awards of the University of Exeter, and in 2007, gained University College status, as the University College Plymouth St Mark & St John. It was awarded full university status as Plymouth Marjon University in 2013.

Campus
The university campus is located several miles north of Plymouth city centre, next to Derriford Hospital. Residential accommodation is provided, with all first-year students guaranteed a place. In 2013 a major investment programme in campus facilities was completed, with new sport and exercise science laboratories, extensive indoor and outdoor sports provision, a theatre, a media centre and a music studio.

Academic profile

Notable alumni

 Sharon Berry, founder of the Storybook Dads charity 
 Bob Brunning, bass guitarist, founder member of Fleetwood Mac
 Joy Carroll, inspiration for The Vicar of Dibley
 Sir Lewis Casson, established the Actors' Association which became the British Actors' Equity Association.
 Tim Dakin, former Bishop of Winchester
 Helen Glover, London 2012 Olympic gold medal-winning rower and 2013 World Championship Gold Medal winner
 Harry Greenway, former Conservative MP for Ealing North
 Philip Kingsford, in 1912 held the best-ever triple jump record by an English-born athlete
 Ernest Millington, Labour MP for Chelmsford 1945–50, and was the last surviving member of the House of Commons elected during the Second World War (he died in 2009).
 Ron Pickering, athletics coach and BBC sports commentator
 Paul Potts, English tenor. Winner of ITV's Britain's Got Talent 2007
 Henry Rawlingson Carr, Nigerian educationalist and administrator.
 Andrew Salkey, author, activist, poet, film and documentary maker 
 Sir Frederick Wall, secretary of the Football Association, responsible for the purchase of the first Wembley Stadium
 Ian Whybrow, children's author.
 Anthony Willis, Paralympic games silver high jump and gold pentathlon winner.

See also
 Armorial of UK universities
 College of Education
 List of universities in the UK

References 

 
Education in Plymouth, Devon
Educational institutions established in 1923
1923 establishments in England
Plymouth Marjon
Plymouth Marjon